Acheilognathus longibarbatus is a species of fresh water ray-finned fish in the genus Acheilognathus.  It is endemic to Laos and northern Vietnam.  It grows to a maximum length of 9.2 cm.

References

Acheilognathus
Fish described in 1978